George Albert Hormel (December 4, 1860 – June 5, 1946) was an American entrepreneur, he was the founder of Hormel Foods Corporation (then known as George A. Hormel & Co.) in 1891. His ownership stake in the company made him one of the wealthiest Americans during his lifetime.

Early life
Hormel was born in Buffalo, New York, in 1860 to German immigrant John George Hormel, a leather tanner, and Susannah "Susan" Hormel (née Decker), and later settled in Austin, Minnesota. At the age of twelve, he began working in a Chicago packinghouse. Hormel married Lilian Belle Gleason in 1892.

Hormel Foods Corporation
He established his meat packing company in 1891 and established a food company that continues to thrive today.

He remained head of the company until 1929, when he passed it to his son Jay Catherwood Hormel.

Death and legacy
He died on June 5, 1946, in Los Angeles, California, at the age of 85. He is buried at Oakwood Cemetery in Austin, Minnesota.

His great-grandson Smokey Hormel is a noted guitarist.

See also
 Hormel Historic Home

References

External links
 Hormel Historic Home in Austin, Minnesota

1860 births
1946 deaths
American people of German descent
Meat packing industry
Hormel Foods people
People from Austin, Minnesota